Aleksandar "Aca" Nikolić (28 October 1924 – 12 March 2000) was a Serbian professional basketball player and coach. He was also a professor at the University of Belgrade's Faculty of Sport and Physical Education. He is often referred to as the Father of Yugoslav Basketball.

Nikolić was a mentor of many world-class basketball coaches, such Božidar Maljković, Dušan Ivković, Bogdan Tanjević, Željko Obradović, etc. Nikolić was nicknamed the Professor, the Iron Sergeant. Nikolić was inducted into the Basketball Hall of Fame as a coach in 1998, and into the FIBA Hall of Fame in 2007. In 2008, he was named one of the 50 Greatest EuroLeague Contributors.

Early life
Though his parents lived in Brčko, Nikolić was born in Sarajevo, Kingdom of Serbs, Croats and Slovenes, due to his pregnant mother, Krista, suddenly going into labour while visiting her sister in Sarajevo. Young Aleksandar enjoyed a privileged upbringing courtesy of his wealthy father, Đorđe Nikolić, who had him at the age of 62. After spending the first few years of his life in Brčko, Nikolić moved with his family to the capital Belgrade, where he would grow up.

Nikolić attended the Kralj Aleksandar Gymnasium at the Belgrade neighbourhood of Banovo Brdo. He then studied medicine and law at the University of Belgrade, graduating in 1946.

Playing career
A small forward, Nikolić played 7 seasons in the Yugoslavia Federal League, from 1945 to 1951. During his playing days, he played for the Yugoslav Army (1945), Partizan (1946), Crvena zvezda (1945, 1947–1949), Železničar Čačak and BSK Beograd (1951). He won the Yugoslav Championships in 1945 with the Yugoslav Army and in 1947, 1948, and 1949, with Crvena Zvezda. He retired as a player with BSK Beograd in 1951.

National team playing career
Nikolić was a member of the Yugoslavia national basketball team during the late 1940s, making in 10 appearances.

Coaching career

Club coaching career
After his playing career was over, Nikolić became involved with coaching, both with Serbia-based clubs, and those in Italy, notably Ignis Varese.

Yugoslavia national team
Nikolić was also the head coach of the senior Yugoslav national squad, between 1951 and 1965, and later between 1977 and 1978. During this time, he coached two future members of the FIBA Hall of Fame, in Borislav Stanković and Krešimir Ćosić. Under his leadership, Yugoslavia won the gold medals at the 1978 FIBA World Championship and the 1977 EuroBasket; silver medals at the 1963 FIBA World Championship, 1961 EuroBasket, and 1965 EuroBasket, and a bronze medal at the 1963 EuroBasket.

Death
Nikolić died on 12 March 2000, in Belgrade. He is buried in the Alley of Distinguished Citizens at Belgrade's New Cemetery. After his death, Aleksandar Nikolić Hall was named after him, in his honor.

In popular culture 
 In the 2015 Serbian sports drama, We Will Be the World Champions, Nikolić is portrayed by Marko Janketić.

See also 
 Aleksandar Nikolić Hall
 Radomir Šaper
 FIBA Basketball World Cup winning head coaches
 List of FIBA EuroBasket winning coaches
 List of EuroLeague-winning coaches

References

External links
 Aleksandar Nikolić at fiba.basketball
 Aleksandar Nikolić at hoophall.com
 Aleksandar Nikolić at leagabasket.it 
 Sećanje na slavnog Profesora at mondo.rs 

1924 births
2000 deaths
Bosnia and Herzegovina expatriate basketball people in Serbia
EuroLeague-winning coaches
FIBA EuroBasket-winning coaches
FIBA Hall of Fame inductees
Fortitudo Pallacanestro Bologna coaches
KK Borac Čačak coaches
KK Crvena zvezda head coaches
KK Crvena zvezda players
KK Partizan coaches
KK Partizan players
OKK Beograd coaches
OKK Beograd players
KK Železničar Čačak players
Naismith Memorial Basketball Hall of Fame inductees
Pallacanestro Petrarca Padova coaches
Pallacanestro Varese coaches
Reyer Venezia coaches
Serbian men's basketball coaches
Serbian men's basketball players
Serbian expatriate basketball people in Italy
Serbs of Bosnia and Herzegovina
Small forwards
Basketball players from Sarajevo
Academic staff of the University of Belgrade
University of Belgrade Faculty of Medicine alumni
Victoria Libertas Pesaro coaches
Virtus Bologna coaches
Yugoslav basketball coaches
Yugoslav men's basketball players
Burials at Belgrade New Cemetery
1942 Belgrade Basketball Championship players